John Bradford Mooney, Jr. (March 26, 1931 – May 30, 2014)  was a rear admiral in the United States Navy. He was a 1953 graduate of the United States Naval Academy. He served as Chief of Naval Research  from 1983 to 1987 and Oceanographer of the United States Navy from 1981 to 1983.

References

1931 births
2014 deaths
United States Navy admirals